Lesko Synagogue is a synagogue in Lesko, Poland. The synagogue had functioned as a place of worship until World War II.

History
The synagogue was built during the years 1626-1654 by the Sephardic Jewish community of Lesko. By the twentieth century, it was one of six synagogues in the town, and the only one whose building survived the Second World War, although in a very damaged state; the interior was devastated by the German invaders of Poland. For almost two decades after the war, it was neglected. It was renovated from the 1960s onwards.

The building was constructed in the mannerist-early baroque style with characteristic gables decorated with volutes and stone baroque vases. Some of the elements are gothic - buttresses, tower. The façade bears a Hebrew inscription that reads, in translation: "He was afraid and said, 'How awesome is this place! This is none other than the house of God; this is the gate of heaven'" (Genesis 28:17). The interior was adorned in mannerist style with niches, cornices and architraves.

Since the 1980s the synagogue is the site of Muzeum Żydów Galicji (Museum of the Jews of Galicia) and an art gallery that includes exhibits by artists of the Bieszczady region.

Gallery

See also 
 List of mannerist structures in Southern Poland

References

External links

 Historia synagogi   

17th-century synagogues
Art museums and galleries in Poland
Former synagogues in Poland
Hasidic Judaism in Poland
Hasidic synagogues
Lesko County
Museums in Podkarpackie Voivodeship
Sephardi Jewish culture in Poland
Sephardi synagogues
Synagogues destroyed by Nazi Germany